Hong Kong Disneyland (local nickname HKDL; also known as HK Disneyland) is a theme park located on reclaimed land in Penny's Bay, Lantau Island. It is located inside the Hong Kong Disneyland Resort and it is owned and managed by Hong Kong International Theme Parks. It is the largest theme park in Hong Kong, followed by Ocean Park Hong Kong. Hong Kong Disneyland was opened to visitors on Monday, 12 September 2005 at 13:00 HKT. Disney attempted to avoid problems of cultural backlash by incorporating Chinese culture, customs and traditions when designing and building the resort, including adherence to the rules of feng shui. Notably, a bend was put in a walkway near the Hong Kong Disneyland Resort entrance so good qi energy would not flow into the South China Sea.

The park consists of seven themed areas: Main Street, U.S.A., Fantasyland, Adventureland, Tomorrowland, Grizzly Gulch, Mystic Point, and Toy Story Land. A new themed area — World of Frozen, is currently being developed and will hopefully open in 2023. The theme park's cast members speak Cantonese, English and Mandarin. Guide maps are printed in traditional and simplified Chinese as well as English.

The park has a daily capacity of 34,000 visitors — the lowest of all Disneyland parks. The park attracted 5.2 million visitors in its first year, below its target of 5.6 million. Visitor numbers fell 20% in the second year to 4 million, inciting criticisms from local legislators. However, the park attendance jumped by 8% in the third year, attracting a total of 4.5 million visitors in 2007. In 2009, the park attendance again increased by 2% to 4.8 million visitors. The attendance continued to surge and received 5.23 million guests in the 2009/2010 fiscal year. Since the opening of Hong Kong Disneyland, the theme park has hosted over 25 million guests. According to AECOM and TEA, Hong Kong Disneyland is the 13th most visited theme park in the world in 2013, with 7.4 million visitors.

Majority-owned (53%) by the Hong Kong Government but managed by Disney, the park first turned an annual net profit of HK$109 million (US$13.97 million) for the year ended 29 September 2012. However, it has operated at an increasing loss in 2015, 2016 and 2017. Hong Kong Disneyland currently occupies  and hosts 6 million to 7 million visitors annually. The park capacity will increase to handle up to 10 million visitors annually over a 15-year expansion period.

History

Early history 

Penny's Bay was filled in to provide land for the construction of Hong Kong Disneyland. The bay was previously undeveloped except for the Cheoy Lee Shipyard, which opened in the 1960s.

Chief Executive of Hong Kong Tung Chee Hwa was instrumental in introducing the Disneyland project to Hong Kong. When the SARS epidemic devastated the city's economy in 2003, it was hoped that the new Disneyland would help boost confidence in Hong Kong's tourism industry.

Hong Kong Disneyland had one of the shortest construction periods of any Disneyland-style theme park. On 12 January 2003, more than 400 guests celebrated the groundbreaking of Hong Kong Disneyland after the finishing of land reclamation in Penny's Bay. The audience included Tung Chee Hwa; Michael D. Eisner, former chairman and CEO of The Walt Disney Company; Bob Iger, president of The Walt Disney Company; and Jay Rasulo, former president of Walt Disney Parks and Resorts. On 23 September 2004, a special "castle topping ceremony" was held in the park to commemorate the placing of the tallest turret on Sleeping Beauty Castle. Hong Kong Disneyland was officially opened to the public on 12 September 2005 by then the Chief Executive of Hong Kong Donald Tsang, Chief Executive Officer Michael Eisner, President Bob Iger. Beijing offered its significant support by sending Zeng Qinghong, Vice President of the People's Republic of China. In order to help Hong Kong Disneyland grow, Beijing also deliberately slowed down the development of Shanghai Disney Resort, which was first planned for the early 2000s.

Expansion 

In January 2012, Hong Kong Disneyland has been in the process of negotiating with the Government of Hong Kong to invest its HK$5 billion profit for new attractions. Further details of the expansion would be announced within a 12-month period from January 2012. A shopping complex and new hotels would be taken into consideration for the new expansion plan.

In Hong Kong financial secretary John Tsang's 2013–14 budget speech, he announced that a new night time parade: "Disney Paint The Night Parade", as well as a themed area featuring characters from the Marvel Universe, will be built in Hong Kong Disneyland. On 8 October 2013 then Walt Disney Parks and Resorts chairman Thomas O. Staggs confirmed the development of the Iron Man Experience.

On 17 February 2014, Hong Kong Disneyland announced its 2012–13 financial results as well as a plan for the third hotel at the resort. The third hotel would be the largest hotel at the resort, featuring 750 rooms with an adventure and exotic theme, and would cost  to build. The third hotel, Disney Explorers Lodge, opened on 30 April 2017.

Hong Kong Disneyland was also built with the space for a second park directly across from the entrance to the current park. Disney has not yet announced that the second park is in development. Land is also available for additional hotels other than the three current, but the common thought is that the second park will be built before a fourth hotel. However, it was announced in September 2020 by the Hong Kong Government that Hong Kong Disneyland's option to purchase the 60-hectare expansion site next to the existing park will not be extended after its expiry on 24 September 2020 as it is unable to commit to using the site in the near future.

On 22 November 2016, the Walt Disney Company and the Hong Kong Government announced plans for a multi-year,  expansion of Hong Kong Disneyland. The proposed expansion includes a Frozen-themed area (announced for 2021), a Marvel-themed area (opening in phases from 2018 to 2023), a redesigned Sleeping Beauty Castle and hub (announced for 2020), a reimagined attraction (announced for 2021), a new Moana stage show (announced for 2018), and live entertainment.

On 24 May 2018, Hong Kong Disneyland opened the first project part of the multi-year expansion: Moana: a Homecoming Celebration, an atmosphere stage show performed daily at the newly built Jungle Junction venue in Adventureland. The park also gave more information on the coming projects as well as the revised dates for these projects: the shooting dark ride Ant-Man and The Wasp: Nano Battle!, replacing Buzz Lightyear Astro Blasters, opened in 2019 and the new expanded castle will be unveiled in 2020, in time for the park's 15th anniversary. Park officials also confirmed the rumors that the future Frozen-themed area will feature a copy of Epcot's Frozen Ever After and a family roller coaster named Wandering Oaken’s Sliding Sleighs, replacing the previously announced Dancing Sleighs ride, and that the area will open in 2021.

On 26 January 2020, the park closed due to the ongoing COVID-19 pandemic along with Ocean Park Hong Kong and Shanghai Disneyland Park. It remained closed for nearly five months, reopening on 18 June 2020. It was the second worldwide Disney park to reopen after Shanghai Disneyland. It reopened with similar strict rules as Shanghai Disneyland, which included limited guest attendance, social distancing, temperature checks, and mandatory wearing of face masks. Hong Kong Disneyland closed again from 15 July to 25 September 2020 due to a heavy upsurge in domestic cases. After reopening for approximately two months, it was announced the park would close for a third time on 2 December 2020 due to a rising number of COVID-19 cases in the region. The park reopened on 19 February 2021. The park closed for the fourth time on 7 January 2022 due to the rising number of cases of the Omicron variant, and reopened on 21 April 2022.

Timeline

 1998
 August – The Walt Disney Company and the government of Hong Kong announce their intention to construct a themed entertainment park in Hong Kong, the second in Asia
 1999
 February – Penny's Bay, Lantau Island is announced as the future site of the Hong Kong Disneyland Resort
 10 December – Disney and the Hong Kong Government sign an agreement for building the second Disney Resort in Asia
 2003
 1 January – Construction on Hong Kong Disneyland Resort begins
 2004
 22 November – Disney announces that the opening day of the park has been rescheduled from 2006 to 12 September 2005
 2005
 12 September – Hong Kong Disneyland officially opens to the public at 13:00 HKT by the Chief Executive of Hong Kong Donald Tsang, Chief Executive Officer of the Walt Disney Company Michael Eisner, Vice President of the People's Republic of China Zeng Qinghong as Beijing declaration congress and President of the Walt Disney Company Bob Iger.
 2006
 June – HKDL announces to release Summer Passes to boost its first year attendance
 13 July – Autopia, Stitch Encounter and UFO Zone opens in HKDL as first part of its expansion
 August – Exclusive treats are provided for Summer Pass holders so as to further boost the park's attendance
 4 September – More than 60,000 Summer Passes have been sold since 1 July. However, Hong Kong Disneyland has missed its target of 5.6 million in the first year of operation, with only about 5 million guests entered the park since the opening
 28 September – HKDL launches its annual pass
 30 September – Disney's Halloween celebration held for the first time through 31 October 2006
 14 December – HKDL announced three new attractions to be added to the park in 2007–2008
 2007
 26 June – HKDL revealed its attractions for the park's 2007 summer – "Mickey's Summer Blast" and announcement of Mickey's Water Works Parade and Animation Academy's opening date- 14 July 2007
 19 December – HKDL revealed 4 new attractions and entertainment venues to open in 2008 with "It's a Small World": Muppet Mobile Lab, High School Musical Celebration, Turtle Talk with Crush and the Art of Animation
 2008
 28 April – "It's a Small World" opens in HKDL as first extension of Fantasyland
 2009
 10 July – The Legislative Council of Hong Kong approved the three land expansion of HKDL
 13 December – Groundbreaking ceremony for the construction of the three land expansion

 2010
 12 September – HKDL celebrates its 5th year milestone
 2011
 21 January – HKDL hosts the year-long 5th anniversary programme "Celebration in the Air"
 18 November – Toy Story Land opens
 2012
 14 July – Grizzly Gulch opens
 2013
 17 May – Mystic Point opens
 7 October – Iron Man Experience is announced 
 6 November – Disney Paint the Night parade is announced
 2014
 February – Construction of Iron Man Experience begins
 1 October – Nighttime parade Disney Paint the Night starts to run
 2015
 12 September – HKDL celebrates its 10th year milestone
 17 November – HKDL hosts the year-long 10th anniversary programme "Happily Ever After"
 17 December – Fairytale Forest, a new attraction in Fantasyland, opens
 21 December – Mickey and the Wondrous Storybook replaces The Golden Mickeys as the new flagship live stage show of Fantasyland
 2016
 11 June – Star Wars: Tomorrowland Takeover, a Star Wars-themed seasonal event, launches
 22 November – HKDL announces its new expansion and development plan, which includes the construction of a Frozen-themed area, introduction of Marvel-themed rides, redesigning of the Sleeping Beauty Castle and more
 2017
 11 January – Iron Man Experience opens
 30 April 2017 – Disney Explorers Lodge opens
 31 August – Buzz Lightyear Astro Blasters closed to replace Ant-Man and The Wasp: Nano Battle!
 13 October – Construction begins on Moana, Frozen, and Marvel attractions
 14 December – Royal Princess Garden opens temporarily at Main Street, U.S.A.
 2018
 1 January – The Sleeping Beauty Castle closed for redesign, causing the Disney in the Stars fireworks to be discontinued as well.
 15 March – We Love Mickey! debuts at Main Street, U.S.A.
 25 May – Moana: A Homecoming Celebration opens at Jungle Junction in Adventureland
 7 November – We Love Mickey! Birthday Edition debuts at Main Street, U.S.A. as part of Mickey Mouse's 90th Anniversary
 2019
 16 February – The "Heart" Gazebo at Fantasyland closed to give way for the Frozen Land
 31 March – Ant-Man and The Wasp: Nano Battle! opens
 21 June – Royal Princess Garden and Bibbidi Bobbidi Boutique at Main Street, U.S.A. has closed for relocation to Fantasyland
 1 July – Bibbidi Bobbidi Boutique at Fantasyland has officially opened to the public 

 2020
 26 January – The park closed due to the COVID-19 pandemic.
 18 June – Following a nearly five-month closure, the park reopened to the public with new and enhanced health and safety measures.
 15 July – The park closed for the second time due to a rising number of COVID-19 cases.
 12 September – While closed, the park celebrated its 15th anniversary.
 24 September – Hong Kong Disneyland's option to purchase the adjacent expansion site expired and will not be renewed
 25 September – The park reopened to the public, implementing reduced operations, including closures on Tuesdays and Thursdays (except public holidays and special days designated by the resort from time to time).
 21 November – The park's centerpiece castle, now called Castle of Magical Dreams, was officially unveiled.
 2 December – The park closed for the third time due to a rising number of COVID-19 cases.
 2021
 19 February – The park reopens for the third time.
 17 November – The park closed for one day following a single COVID-19 exposure from a park guest.
 2022
 7 January – The park closes for the fourth time due to fears of a COVID-19 surge of the Omicron variant.
 21 April – The park reopens for the fourth time.
 18 June – Momentous debuts.

2023
World of Frozen 
TBD
Stark Expo

Park layout and attractions 

The park, partially in Islands District and Tsuen Wan District, is divided into "lands" (themed areas) and well-concealed backstage areas. On entering a land, a guest is completely immersed in a themed environment and is unable to see or hear any other realm. The idea behind this was to develop theatrical "stages" with seamless passages from one land to the next. When the park initially opened, it consisted of only four themed areas instead of the traditional five lands:
 Main Street, U.S.A., designed to resemble an early 20th-century Midwest town;
 Adventureland, featuring jungle-themed adventures;
 Fantasyland, bringing to life characters from fairy tales and Disney films;
 Tomorrowland, an optimistic vision of the future.

On 30 June 2009, Donald Tsang, the then Chief Executive of Hong Kong, announced that the expansion of Hong Kong Disneyland had been approved by the Executive Council. The park received three new themed lands — Grizzly Gulch, Mystic Point and Toy Story Land — all located outside the Disneyland Railroad track, south of the current area.

 Toy Story Land, based on the Disney·Pixar film series Toy Story. Opened 18 November 2011.
 Grizzly Gulch, reminiscing an abandoned mining town set amidst mountains and woods. Opened 14 July 2012.
 Mystic Point, heart of a dense, uncharted rain forest where supernatural events take place. Opened 17 May 2013.

On 2 May 2017, the Executive Council approved another multi-year expansion of Hong Kong Disneyland, adding two new themed lands — World of Frozen and Stark Expo — to the park.

 World of Frozen, themed to the popular Disney franchise Frozen. Opening in 2023.
 Stark Expo, inviting guests to combat villains with Marvel superheroes. Opening in 2023.

Throughout the park are 'Hidden Mickeys', or representations of Mickey Mouse heads inserted subtly into the design of attractions and environmental decor.

An elevated berm supports the  narrow gauge Hong Kong Disneyland Railroad (built by Severn Lamb) that circumnavigates the park.

Lands of Hong Kong Disneyland

The park currently has seven themed areas hosting various rides, shops, restaurants, and live entertainment.

Main Street, U.S.A.

Inspired by the Main Street, U.S.A. in Disneyland, the buildings of this Main Street are almost identical to those in Anaheim. Like other Disney theme parks, Hong Kong Disneyland's Main Street, U.S.A. serves as the entrance of the park. Plans originally featured a restaurant under the Railroad station, but were scrapped due to budget reasons. The decor is small-town America from the years 1890–1910.

Though being very similar to Anaheim's main street, the theme is heavily influenced by European immigrants. Plaza Inn — which has the identical exterior design as the one in Disneyland — mimics a classical Chinese eatery that was created by a wealthy American couple who were infatuated with Chinese culture. Another restaurant, the Market House Bakery is reminiscent of a bakery founded by a Viennese pastry chef who brought the world's most famous desserts from the Austrian imperial court.

Unlike Main Streets from other parks, Main Street at Hong Kong Disneyland is built mainly of wood instead of stone. There are no horse-drawn streetcars, though tracks for another of the Main Street Vehicle can be seen in concept art.

Adventureland

Hong Kong Disneyland's Adventureland is the biggest among all Disney parks. It features a large island area home to Tarzan's Treehouse, which is circled by the Jungle Cruise (Jungle River Cruise) — much like the Rivers of America in most Frontierland theme areas. The Adventureland is also home to the "Festival of the Lion King" show. The new atmosphere stage show "Moana: a Homecoming Celebration" debuted on 25 May 2018 at Jungle Junction. A new outdoor venue. it is the first part of the multi-year expansion being unveiled to the public.

Fantasyland

Fantasyland features Castle of Magical Dreams (formerly Sleeping Beauty Castle) as its icon. It also has several attractions based on Disney films such as The Many Adventures of Winnie the Pooh, Dumbo the Flying Elephant, It's a Small World and Cinderella's Carousel. There is also Fantasy Gardens where costumed Disney characters can be met, and a Fairy Tale Forest.

Tomorrowland

Tomorrowland at Hong Kong Disneyland features an emphasis on metallic trim, dominated by blue and purple hues. Since the opening of the park, unique attractions have been added into the Hong Kong's Tomorrowland, such as a new Autopia and Stitch Encounter. The first ever Marvel attraction in a Disney theme park, The Iron Man Experience, opened on 11 January 2017 in an area previously envisioned for a Star Tours-type attraction. The land also featured Buzz Lightyear Astro Blasters on opening day, but that was replaced with Ant-Man and The Wasp: Nano Battle!, which opened on 31 March 2019.

Toy Story Land

Opened on 18 November 2011, Toy Story Land is the first new themed land since the opening of Hong Kong Disneyland in 2005. It is located to the west side of the park, behind Fantasyland. Toy Story Land is themed using bamboo to act as giant blades of grass surrounding the area. The themed land makes use of characters from the Toy Story movies, such as an enlarged Woody, Rex, an oversized paper plane, and Luxo Jr.

Toy Story Land was marketed by the park as "Asia exclusive". For some time its only counterpart, Toy Story Playland, is located at Walt Disney Studios Park in Marne-la-Vallée, France. Since Toy Story Land became popular at this park, it will become more common. One at Disney’s Hollywood Studios in Orlando opened in June 2018, and one in Shanghai Disneyland opened even earlier.

Grizzly Gulch

Opened on 14 July 2012, this land is the Hong Kong equivalent of Frontierland and Critter Country. The themed land reminisces an abandoned mining town called "Grizzly Gulch", set amidst mountains and woods. The centrepiece structure is Big Grizzly Mountain Runaway Mine Cars, inspired by Grizzly Peak in Disney California Adventure Park. The town was set to be founded 8 August 1888 — the luckiest day of the luckiest month of the luckiest year — by prospectors looking to discover gold.

Mystic Point

Opened on 17 May 2013, Mystic Point is a new themed land in Hong Kong Disneyland. It is also the final area opened in Hong Kong Disneyland's current expansion. It is set in 1909 at an adventurer's outpost established in 1896 in a dense, uncharted rain forest surrounded by mysterious forces and supernatural events. The site features Mystic Manor, home of Lord Henry Mystic, a world traveler and adventurer and his mischievous monkey, Albert.

Future areas

World of Frozen 

A land behind Fantasyland will host two rides themed to the movie Frozen. World of Frozen is set in the fictional Kingdom of Arendelle. The land will feature two rides, a sleigh style family rollercoaster, and a Frozen dark ride similar to Frozen Ever After at EPCOT.  It was originally set to open in 2020, but the opening date was delayed to second-half of 2023, due to the COVID-19 pandemic.

Stark Expo

On 22 November 2016, it was announced that Tomorrowland would be partly transformed into a Marvel-themed area, as part of a massive six year expansion plan. This expansion would see the replacement of Buzz Lightyear Astro Blasters by an attraction featuring Ant-Man and The Wasp, named "Ant-Man and The Wasp: Nano Battle!" for 2019 and the construction, on the former Autopia site, of a major E ticket attraction, "Avengers Quinjet", based on the Avengers franchise to be completed by 2023.

Entertainment and celebrations
Seasonal entertainment, such as "Disney's Haunted Halloween", "A Sparkling Christmas", and "Disney's Chinese New Year", are held in the park to celebrate major holidays.

Entertainment

Disney Paint the Night
Paint the Night debuted on 11 September 2014. It is a successor of the Main Street Electrical Parade and the first fully LED parade Disney has ever created. It features seven original floats containing over 740,000 individual lights. According to David Lightbody, Director of Entertainment and Costuming of the resort, the creative team spent over 2 years and developed over 1,000 scenic and lighting designs to ensure the parade.

Follow Your Dreams and Momentous
With the completion of Sleeping Beauty Castle's transformation into the Castle of Magical Dreams, new daytime and nighttime shows were introduced. 

Follow Your Dreams, the daytime show, debuted on 30 June 2021, and is Hong Kong Disneyland’s first outdoor castle stage show. The show involves Mickey Mouse, his friends, and other Disney characters as they take the audience on a journey to inspire them to never give up on their dreams. 

Momentous, the nighttime spectacular, debuted on 18 June 2022. Billed as “The Most Magical Show on Earth”, Momentous tells the story of life and the moments it brings through the lens of Disney and Pixar stories and music. The spectacular, originally known as Cherish the Memories, was designed during the castle transformation.

Both shows were slated to premiere in 2020 for Hong Kong Disneyland’s 15th anniversary celebration (in fact, Momentous uses the anniversary anthem "Love the Memory" as its main theme), but were delayed due to the COVID-19 pandemic.

"We Love Mickey" Projection Show
This spectacular was designed to fill the void between the closure of Disney in the Stars as the castle underwent its transformation; this nightly show of approximately 15 minutes is described as a surprise celebration that will transform the buildings along Main Street, U.S.A. into a canvas of vibrant, colorful visuals that pay tribute to Mickey Mouse's major milestones.

Park celebrations

Hong Kong Disneyland has organised entertainment and a number of shows as part of the festive celebrations to attract more visitors, especially young adults.

One of the events is the world's exclusive Disney's Haunted Halloween, which is the only Magic Kingdom-themed park in the world to celebrate the Halloween season with frightening walk-through attractions. Even though the attractions are full of living haunts and spectres that appear around corners, Disney tradition is preserved and gory scenes are excluded. It was later replaced by Disney Halloween Time event for serious challenge.

Amenities
Hong Kong Disneyland gives out free birthday badges to people celebrating their birthday at Hong Kong Disneyland. Name tags are also available when you ask the cast members. 
One of the special features of Hong Kong Disneyland is that there are free Disneyland themed stickers given out in the park and hotels. Visitors may ask cast members for these exclusive stickers. Each sticker is themed by an individual Disney character.

Hong Kong Disneyland: The Grand Opening Celebration Album
Hong Kong Disneyland: The Grand Opening Celebration Album was the soundtrack for the grand opening ceremony of Hong Kong Disneyland at Hong Kong Disneyland Resort. Much of the album are Cantonese or Mandarin cover of theme songs of animated Disney films. The package contains a DVD featuring music videos. The album does not contain any music used in the park.

Track listing
 Released: 2 September 2005
 Label: Sony Music Entertainment (Hong Kong)
 Language: Cantonese and Mandarin
 Status: Out of print

 Jacky Cheung – "Let the Wonder Soar" (讓奇妙飛翔) (Cantonese)
 Twins – "It's a Small World"
 Eason Chan – "A Whole New World" (from Aladdin)
 Karen Mok – "When You Wish Upon a Star" (from Pinocchio)
 Twins – "Mickey Mouse Theme"
 Jolin Tsai – "Under the Sea" (from The Little Mermaid)
 Kelly Chen & Kellyjackie – "On a Date With Him to Disneyland" (他約我去迪士尼)
 Nicholas Tse – "Bare Necessities" (from The Jungle Book)
 CoCo Lee – "Colors of the Wind" (from Pocahontas)
 Joey Yung – "Undying True Love" (from Beauty and the Beast)
 Kelly Chen – "Reflection" (from Mulan)
 Harlem Yu – "Can You Feel the Love Tonight" (from The Lion King)
 Jacky Cheung – "Let the Wonder Soar" (讓奇妙飛翔) (Mandarin)

DVD
 Subtitles: Traditional Chinese
 Region Code: All region

 "Let the Wonder Soar" (讓奇妙飛翔) music video – Jacky Cheung
 "On a Date With Him to Disneyland" (他約我去迪士尼) music video – Kelly Chen & Kellyjackie
 Cars trailer
 The Chronicles of Narnia: The Lion, The Witch and the Wardrobe trailer
 Chicken Little trailer
 Sky High trailer

Public transport

MTR

The park is accessible on the MTR via the purpose-built Disneyland Resort line, a themed shuttle train service between the Disneyland Resort station adjacent to the park, and Sunny Bay station, where passengers can transfer to the Tung Chung line for access to Hong Kong Island, Kowloon, or Tung Chung. The line runs modified Metro Cammell M-Trains on the  non-stop route. The trains have been converted to run fully automatically without drivers.

Bus

Long Win Bus operates 3 regular routes to the Disneyland Resort Public Transport Interchange in front of the park.

Route R8 is a circular route running between Disneyland and the Lantau Link Toll Plaza Bus Interchange. The latter can be accessed by any of the routes with the A or E prefixes (e.g. A11 or E32), and is always the first stop after crossing the Tsing Ma Bridge. It is the only all-day route serving the park, and is jointly operated with vehicles from Citybus.

Two additional regular routes, running on weekends and public holidays only, provide direct service between other places in the New Territories and Disneyland. They are route R33 to Tuen Mun station, connecting to the MTR, and route R42 to Tai Wai station via Tsuen Wan and Sha Tin. For both routes, one trip departs towards Disneyland in the mornings and the return trip departs approximately 20 minutes after the evening fireworks display.

In addition to the above regular trips, seven special routes (including one cross-harbour route) operate to and from Disneyland before and after special events at the park, of which two are operated by Citybus and the other five by Long Win Bus.

Certain midday and late evening trips of Citybus route B5 between the Hong Kong–Zhuhai–Macau Bridge Hong Kong Port and Sunny Bay station are routed via Disneyland.

Criticisms

2005/2006 Overcrowding problems
Just before the grand opening, the park was criticised for underestimating the daily capacity.  The problem became apparent on the charity preview day on 4 September 2005, when 30,000 locals visited the park. The event turned out to be a disappointment, as there were too many guests. Wait times at fast food outlets were at least 45 minutes, and wait times at rides went up to 2 hours.

Although the park's shareholders and the Hong Kong Government set pressure upon the park to lower the capacity, the park insisted on keeping the limit, only agreeing to relieve the capacity problem by extending the opening time by one hour and introducing more discounts during weekdays. However, the park stated that local visitors tend to stay in the park for more than nine hours per visit, implying that the mentioned practices would do little to solve the problem.

During the Lunar New Year 2006, many visitors arrived at the park in the morning bearing valid tickets, but were refused entry, because the park was already at full capacity. Some disgruntled visitors, mainly tourists, attempted to force their way into the park by climbing over the barrier gates. Disneyland management was forced to revise their ticketing policy and designated future periods close to public holidays as 'special days' during which admission would only be allowed through a date-specific ticket. Ticket prices during the week were changed to reflect cheaper prices. Meanwhile, weekend prices were raised. The prices were changed in an attempt to crowd-control so the crowds would be more even throughout the week and therefore the lines would not be as bad on weekends.

Public relations
Disney initially refused to release the attendance figures after media reports surfaced saying the park's attendance numbers might be lower than expected. Disney finally declared on 24 November 2005, that Disney had over 1 million guests during its first two months of operation.

In response to negative publicity locally and to boost visitor numbers, Hong Kong Disneyland offered $50 discounts for admission tickets to holders of Hong Kong I.D. cards in the period before 2005 Christmas. Also, from March to June 2006, the park offered Hong Kong I.D. card holders the opportunity to purchase a two-day admission ticket for the price of a single day ticket.

Attendance

Because of COVID-19 regulations imposed by the Hong Kong government, the park closed down from 26 January to 18 June 2020. The park then reopened from 19 June to 14 July 2020, however the Hong Kong government retightened community epidemic prevention measures due to the dramatic increase in the number of positive cases. The park reopened on 25 September 2020.

In popular culture
In the 2012 Indian Tamil-language musical romantic comedy film Podaa Podi, a song depicting the relationship between a father and son, written by Vaali and sung by Silambarasan himself, was shot with him and his 1 year old nephew Samarth at Hong Kong Disneyland, making it the first Tamil film to be shot there.

The hit Indian sitcom Taarak Mehta Ka Ooltah Chashmah filmed episodes 1470 to 1478 at Hong Kong Disneyland, where various show characters experienced the attractions.

MIRROR 'Boss' Music Video was filmed at Hong Kong Disneyland in 2021.

See also
 Shanghai Disneyland
List of lands at Disney theme parks

References

External links

 

 
2005 establishments in Hong Kong
Hong Kong Disneyland Resort
Walt Disney Parks and Resorts
Tourist attractions in China
Tourist attractions in Hong Kong
Amusement parks opened in 2005